The leaders of the League of Nations consisted of a Secretary-General, Deputy Secretary-General and a President of the Assembly selected from member states.

Secretaries General

Deputy Secretaries General

Under Secretaries General

Presidents of the Assembly

See also 

 List of secretaries-general of the United Nations

References
 Northedge, F. S. (1986) The League of Nations: Its Life and Times, 1920–1946  Holmes & Meier, New York, 
 Scott, George (1973) The Rise and Fall of the League of Nations Hutchinson & Co LTD, London, 

 
 
Diplomacy-related lists
League of Nations-related lists